Hylaeaicum mooreanum is a species of flowering plant in the family Bromeliaceae, native to Ecuador and northern Peru. It was first described by Lyman Bradford Smith in 1962 as Neoregelia mooreana.

References

Bromelioideae
Flora of Ecuador
Flora of Peru